

See also 

National Film Awards

References

External links
 http://www.keralafilm.com

Kerala State Film Awards
2010 Indian film awards